Hauptmann (Captain) Friedrich-Karl Burckhardt was a World War I flying ace credited with five aerial victories. He was a professional soldier who already held a pilot's license when World War I began. He served on the Eastern Front until 28 November 1916, when he was promoted to command Jagdstaffel 25 in Macedonia. On 25 February 1918, he was withdrawn back to Germany, where he eventually commanded a home defense squadron until war's end. He scored victories over British, Italian, and French pilots, and was one of the few German aces to serve in aviation for the entirety of World War I.

Early life and prewar service

Friedrich-Karl Burckhardt was born on 24 December 1889 in Koslin, Prussia, which is now located in Poland. From 1902-1904, he served as a cadet. He then joined Prussian Infantry Regiment No. 54. He was already interested in aviation; he garnered Pilot's License No. 418 on 27 May 1913. He then transferred to military aviation.

World War I service

As World War I began, Burckhardt was serving in Feldflieger Abteilung (Field Flier Detachment) 14 on the Eastern Front during August 1914. He was awarded the Iron Cross Second Class on 9 September 1914. He was wounded on 27 September. On 28 October 1914 he was awarded the First Class Iron Cross. He remained with Feldflieger Abteilung 14 until December 1915.

He transferred to Feldflieger Abteilung 30, serving with them until 28 November 1916. He was then appointed to command Jagdstaffel 25, a fighter squadron stationed in Macedonia. Between 15 January and 5 July 1917, he downed four enemy aircraft and an observation balloon. In August 1917, he was again decorated, this time with the Royal House Order of Hohenzollern. On 25 February 1918, he was recalled to Germany. Once there, he was appointed to lead a home defense unit, Kampfeinsitzerstaffel (Combat Single-seater Squadron) 4a.

List of aerial victories
See also Aerial victory standards of World War I

Postwar
He died on 18 June 1962.

Awards and honors
 Iron Cross of 1914
2nd class: 9 September 1914
1st class: 28 October 1914
 Royal House Order of Hohenzollern
 Order of Bravery (Bulgaria)

Sources of information

References
 Franks, Norman; Bailey, Frank W.; Guest, Russell. Above the Lines: The Aces and Fighter Units of the German Air Service, Naval Air Service and Flanders Marine Corps, 1914–1918. Grub Street, 1993. .

1889 births
1962 deaths
German World War I flying aces
Luftstreitkräfte personnel
People from Koszalin
People from the Province of Pomerania
Prussian Army personnel
Recipients of the Order of Bravery
Recipients of the Iron Cross (1914), 1st class